Cadence braking or stutter braking is a driving technique that involves pumping the brake pedal and is used to allow a car to both steer and brake on a slippery surface. It is used to effect an emergency stop where traction is limited to reduce the effect of skidding from road wheels locking up under braking. This can be a particular problem when different tires have different traction, such as on patchy ice for example. Its use in an emergency requires a presence of mind that the situation itself might preclude. Cadence braking is supposed to maximize the time for the driver to steer around the obstacle ahead, as it allows the driver to steer while slowing. It needs to be learned and practiced. For most drivers of modern cars, it has been entirely superseded by ABS, however it is still a valuable skill for drivers of non-ABS equipped vehicles such as classic cars.

Maximum braking force is obtained when there is approximately 10–20% slippage between the braked wheel's rotational speed and the road surface. Beyond this point, rolling grip diminishes rapidly and sliding friction provides a greater proportion of the force that slows the vehicle. Due to local heating and melting of the tires, the sliding friction can be very low. When braking at, or beyond, the peak braking force the steering is ineffective since the grip of the tire is entirely consumed in braking the vehicle.

Anti-lock braking system performs these operations automatically many times per second in rapid succession. A human driver can perform one lock-release cycle per second with practice.

This is done primarily to maintain steering control, at least in part. In wet, hard surfaces, this is useful to reduce somewhat total braking distance. When ABS is present the best emergency stop will usually be obtained by simply pressing very hard on the brakes, forcing the ABS to perform, and steering to avoid the obstacles ahead.

Cadence braking (or any other type of braking) will not help much on extremely slippery surfaces such as ice (in theory it would, but in practice the ice can be so slippery that it makes little difference—a winter tire would make more difference). Also, on very loose surfaces, a quicker stop can be achieved by simply locking the wheels, causing a wedge of loose material to build up ahead of the wheels and create a substantial braking force. This is useful only when stopping in a straight line, because locking the wheels means all steering control would be lost. In such conditions, ABS actually increases the stopping distances. On poor surfaces, in the past, rally drivers timed the pulsing of brake application so as to take advantage of the load transfer as the vehicle pitches forwards and backwards in response to the initial braking effort. With modern, over-dampened, and stiffly sprung suspensions this is less likely to be effective.

While cadence braking is effective on most surfaces, it is less effective at slowing the vehicle than keeping the tires continually at the optimum braking point which is called threshold braking. The latter is an expert driving technique that is even more difficult to learn than cadence braking, and again has been largely superseded by ABS.

Threshold braking, or a good ABS, generally results in the shortest stopping distance in a straight line. ABS, cadence and interference braking are intended to preserve steering control while braking.

References

External links

Driving techniques
Motorcycle dynamics